Brotherstone Hill is a hill near St. Boswells and the Eildon Hills in the Scottish Borders area of Scotland, with two standing stones from the megalithic age, on the summit of Brotherstone Hill, at a height of 418 metres. The stones differ in height (2.45m and 1.60m) and stand 16 metres apart. The stones mark the boundary between the old Borders counties of Roxburghshire and Berwickshire.

Brotherstone Farm is situated off a minor road, between the villages of Gattonside and Smailholm.

See also
Standing stones
List of places in the Scottish Borders
List of places in Scotland

References

External links
RCAHMS record of Brothers' Stones, Brotherstone Hill
Ancient Stones: Brotherstone standing stones
Megalithic Portal: Brothers' Stones

Mountains and hills of the Scottish Borders
Archaeological sites in the Scottish Borders